Busisiwe Paulina "Busi" Shiba is a South African politician who is the current Mpumalanga MEC for Agriculture, Rural Development, Land and Environmental Affairs. She previously served as the Mpumalanga MEC for Cooperative Governance and Traditional Affairs from 2021 to 2022, as the Speaker of the Mpumalanga Provincial Legislature from 2019 to 2021 and as the MEC for Social Development from 2016 to 2019. Shiba is a member of the African National Congress (ANC).

Shiba was the mayor of the Chief Albert Luthuli Local Municipality in Carolina before former Premier of Mpumalanga and now deputy president David Mabuza reshuffled his cabinet and made Shiba the new MEC of Social Development soon after the 
August 2016 local government elections. She was also appointed the convener of the Mpumalanga African National Congress Women's League (ANC).

References

External links
Busisiwe Paulina Shiba – People's Assembly
Speaker's Corner – Mpumalanga Provincial Legislature

Living people
Year of birth missing (living people)
African National Congress politicians
People from Mpumalanga
Women legislative speakers
Women members of provincial legislatures of South Africa
South African women in politics
Members of the Mpumalanga Provincial Legislature